"Top of the World" is a song recorded by American hip hop record production project and duo The Cataracs. It was released as a single on March 22, 2011 as a digital download in the United States and Canada. The song features guest contributions from American singer Dev. An alternative, shorter version of the song was featured on Dev's 2011 mixtape, Is Hot: The Mixtape.

Music video
The music video for the song premiered on YouTube on March 18, 2011.

Track listing

Charts

Certifications

Release history

References

2011 singles
2011 songs
Dev (singer) songs
The Cataracs songs
Song recordings produced by the Cataracs
Songs written by Kshmr
Songs written by David Singer-Vine
Songs written by Dev (singer)
Universal Republic Records singles